Charles B. Tripp was an artist and sideshow performer.

A native of Woodstock, Ontario, Tripp was born without arms but learned to use his legs and feet to perform everyday tasks. He was a skilled carpenter and calligrapher and started supporting his mother and sister when he was a teenager. In 1872, Tripp visited P. T. Barnum in New York City and was quickly hired to work for Barnum's Great Traveling World's Fair. He worked for Barnum (and later James Anthony Bailey) for twenty-three years, then toured for the Ringling brothers for twelve years.

On stage, Tripp cultivated a gentlemanly persona and exhibited his skills in carpentry and penmanship. He also cut paper, took photographs, shaved, and painted portraits. For extra income, he signed promotional pictures of himself with his feet. Tripp often appeared in photographs with Eli Bowen, a "legless wonder" from Ohio. In the photographs, the two rode a tandem bicycle, with Tripp pedaling and Bowen steering.

By the 1910s, Tripp was no longer drawing large crowds for the major circuses, so he joined the traveling carnival circuit. He was accompanied by his wife, Mae, who sold tickets for midway attractions. Tripp died of pneumonia (or asthma) in Salisbury, North Carolina, where he had been wintering for several years. He was buried in Olney, Illinois.

References

External links
 
 The Human Marvels - Armless Wonder

deaths from pneumonia in North Carolina
mouth and foot painting artists
people from Woodstock, Ontario
people without hands
sideshow performers